Bahgat G. Sammakia is an educator and academic administrator who currently serves as Vice President for Research at Binghamton University. He was previously the Interim President of the SUNY Polytechnic Institute. He is also a professor of mechanical engineering and director of the Small Scale Systems Packaging Center at Binghamton University in Binghamton, New York. Sammakia has published over 200 technical papers in refereed journals and conference proceedings, holds 21 U.S. patents and 12 IBM technical disclosures. He has also contributed to three books.

In June 2018, State University of New York senior vice chancellor for research and economic development, Dr. Grace Wang was appointed as SUNY Polytechnic Institute Interim President. She replaced Sammakia on July 1 and earns a salary of $425,000, while continuing to hold her position at SUNY.

Education and career
Sammakia received his B.S. degree in 1977 from the University of Alexandria. He received his M.S. and Ph.D. degrees in 1980 and 1982, respectively from the State University of New York at Buffalo. All of his degrees are in mechanical engineering. The title of his doctoral dissertation is "Transient natural and mixed convection flows and transport adjacent to an ice surface melting in saline water".

After completing his Ph.D., Sammakia was a postdoctoral fellow at the University of Pennsylvania. He began working for IBM in 1984 as an engineer. He continued to work for IBM until 1998, holding various management positions during that time. Some of the groups that he managed at IBM include the thermal and mechanical analysis groups, the surface science group, the chemical lab, and the site technical assurance group.
Sammakia is a Fellow of the ASME, the IEEE and the National Academy of Inventors
Sammakia won the ASME Heat Transfer Memorial Award in 2020
He was honored by the Chancellor of the State University of New York in 2002 for research excellence.

Sammakia was the Vice President for Research at Binghamton University from July 2003 until July 2004.
Dr. Bahgat Sammakia is the interim president at SUNY Polytechnic Institute beginning November third 2016.

Sammakia was the editor of the Journal of Electronics Packaging, which is published by the American Society of Mechanical Engineers.

Patents
7,282,254 Surface coating for electronic systems

6,219,234 Method for using pulsating flow to improve thermal transport in systems

6,058,015 Electronic packages and a method to improve thermal performance of electronic packages

5,966,290 Electronic packages and a method to improve thermal performance of electronic packages

5,912,800 Electronic packages and method to enhance the passive thermal management of electronic packages

5,870,285 Assembly mounting techniques for heat sinks in electronic packaging

5,491,610 Electronic package having active means to maintain its operating temperature constant

5,420,520 Method and apparatus for testing of integrated circuit chips

5,109,318 Pluggable electronic circuit package assembly with snap together heat sink housing

5,028,984 Epoxy composition and use thereof

5,003,429 Electronic assembly with enhanced heat sinking

4,914,551 Electronic package with heat spreader member

4,849,856 Electronic package with improved heat sink

Publications

External links
 The Integrated Electronics Engineering Center

References

Living people
University at Buffalo alumni
Egyptian mechanical engineers
Binghamton University faculty
State University of New York faculty
Fellow Members of the IEEE
American mechanical engineers
Year of birth missing (living people)